Prima Donna is the second extended play by American rapper Vince Staples. It was released on August 26, 2016, by ARTium Recordings and Def Jam Recordings. The extended play features guest appearances from Kilo Kish and ASAP Rocky, while the production was handled by DJ Dahi, James Blake, John Hill and No I.D.

Release and promotion 
On June 20, 2016, Vince Staples revealed on The Fader cover story interview that he would be releasing his six-song EP, called Prima Donna. On August 15, 2016, the release date was announced, along with the release of the cover art and track listing for the album. On September 1, 2016, Staples released a ten-minute short film of the same name directed by Nabil Elderkin.

Critical reception 

Prima Donna received widespread acclaim from critics. At Metacritic, which assigns a normalized rating out of 100 to reviews from music critics, the album received an average score of 83 based on 11 reviews, indicating “universal acclaim”. Scott Glaysher of XXL stated, "There is no doubt that Vince Staples’ popularity is growing exponentially and putting out projects like this only increases his stock value."

Track listing 

Sample credits
 "War Ready" contains samples from "ATLiens" performed by Outkast, and written by André Benjamin and Antwan Patton.

Charts

References 

Vince Staples albums
2016 EPs
Albums produced by DJ Dahi
Albums produced by No I.D.
Albums produced by James Blake (musician)